Timothy Edward Alexander Peto is a professor of medicine at the University of Oxford. He is the co-leader for the Infection Theme of the Oxford Biomedical Research Centre, and a National Institute for Health and Care Research Senior Investigator.

Peto's research has included combination therapy for AIDS, the search for an effective AIDS vaccine, the transmission of methicillin-resistant Staphylococcus aureus in hospitals, and transmission mechanisms for Clostridium difficile infections.

References

Living people
British public health doctors
British infectious disease physicians
Alumni of Brasenose College, Oxford
1950 births
Academics of the University of Oxford
NIHR Senior Investigators